The 2024 United States Senate election in Utah will be held on November 5, 2024, to elect a member of the United States Senate to represent the state of Utah. Incumbent first-term Republican Senator Mitt Romney was elected with 62.6% of the vote in 2018.

Republican primary

Candidates

Filed paperwork
 Gabriel Lobo-Blanco, data architect

Publicly expressed interest
 Jason Chaffetz, former U.S. Representative from Utah's 3rd congressional district (2009–2017)
 Mitt Romney, incumbent U.S. Senator (2019–present)

Potential
 Robert O'Brien, former U.S. National Security Advisor (2019–2021)
 Sean Reyes, Utah Attorney General (2013–present)
 Chris Stewart, U.S. Representative from Utah's 2nd congressional district (2013–present)
 Brad Wilson, Speaker of the Utah House of Representatives (2019–present) from the 15th district (2011–present)

Endorsements

General election

Predictions

References

2024
Utah
United States Senate